WFUS (103.5 FM) is a country music radio station in Tampa, Florida. Licensed to Gulfport, Florida, the station's studios are located in South Tampa and the transmitter site is in Riverview. WFUS is one of the eight stations in the Tampa Bay market owned by iHeartMedia.

The station formerly went by "Thunder 103.5" as a classic rock station that started on March 14, 1995, on 105.5 FM. Ron Diaz worked as the morning drive host at that time. On April 5, 1999, WTBT swapped frequencies with then-sister station WDUV, moving to 103.5 FM. Towards the end of the station's days, it was the Tampa affiliate for The Bob and Tom Show. On April 13, 2005, WTBT flipped to its current country format as WFUS, "US 103.5", leaving Cox Radio's WHPT as the market's only classic rock station at that time. iHeartMedia (then known as Clear Channel Communications) later relaunched the classic rock format as "Thunder Across The Bay", operating on FM translators at 94.5 FM (Gulfport), 99.1 FM (Holiday), 105.9 FM (Tampa), and on WMTX-HD2.

In August 2014, its HD2 subchannel's format changed to "Soft EZ Oldies", a format meant to compete with market leader WDUV. Prior to that, the HD2 subchannel was classic rock, branded as "Thunder 103.5 HD2".

In September 2014, WFUS-HD2 flipped once again, as alternative/new rock formatted "ALT 99-9", meant to compete with Cox Radio's WSUN. "ALT" was also broadcast on FM translator W207BU at 99.9 MHz, located in Bayonet Point. On November 7, 2014, at Noon, W207BU moved from 99.9 MHz to 100.3 MHz to eliminate interference with WXJB in Brooksville. The station then re-branded as "ALT 100.3". The translator also changed call letters, and is now identifying as W262CP. On March 14, 2016, the "ALT" format was replaced with a rebroadcast of iHeart's Sarasota-based tropical/Latin pop-formatted WRUB "Rumba 106.5".

WFUS was the official flagship station of the Tampa Bay Buccaneers from 2004 to 2016. Games are now airing on WXTB.

References

External links
Official website

FUS
Radio stations established in 1963
1963 establishments in Florida
IHeartMedia radio stations